Khiru Mahto (born 1953) is an Indian politician who is currently serving as member of Rajya Sabha from Bihar since 2022. He was elected to the Jharkhand Legislative Assembly from Mandu (Vidhan Sabha constituency) from 2005 until 2009. He is the member of the Janata Dal (United).

References 

Living people
1953 births
Jharkhand MLAs 2005–2009
Rajya Sabha members from Bihar
Janata Dal (United) politicians from Jharkhand